Sevin (given name), a Turkish feminine given name.
 A commercial version of carbaryl (Insecticide).
 Sevin (rapper) an American Christian hip hop musician.

See also
Seven (disambiguation)